The 1988 Delaware Fightin' Blue Hens football team represented the University of Delaware as a member of the Yankee Conference during the 1988 NCAA Division I-AA football season. Led by 23rd-year head coach Tubby Raymond, the Fightin' Blue Hens compiled an overall record of 7–5 with a mark of 6–2 in conference play, sharing the Yankee Conference title with UMass. The team played home games at Delaware Stadium in Newark, Delaware.

Schedule

References

Delaware
Delaware Fightin' Blue Hens football seasons
Yankee Conference football champion seasons
Delaware Fightin' Blue Hens football